Awake the Machines: On the Line Vol. 2 is a various artists compilation album released in 1997 by Out of Line and Sub/Mission Records. Sonic Boom called Awake the Machines: On the Line Vol. 2 "one of the most thorough collections of North American industrial artists available."

Track listing

Personnel
Adapted from the Awake the Machines - On the Line Vol. 2 liner notes.

Musicians
 Birmingham 6 – remixer (2.13)
 Paolo Favati – remixer (1.1)
 Mick Hale – remixer (2.2)
 Sascha Konietzko – remixer (1.8)
 Ricardo May – remixer (11.1)
 Chris Shepard – remixer (1.8)
 vMarkus – remixer (2.5)

Production and design
 John Bergin – cover art
 Dance Assembly Music Network (DAMn!) – design
 Alan Douches – mastering
 Mick Hale – mastering

Release history

References

External links 
 Awake the Machines - On the Line Vol. 2 at Discogs (list of releases)

1997 compilation albums
Out of Line Music compilation albums